The 1995–96 Albanian National Championship was the 57th season of the Albanian National Championship, the top professional league for association football clubs, since its establishment in 1930.

Teams

Stadia and last season

League table 

Note 2: 'Olimpik' is Dinamo Tirana, 'Shqiponja' is Luftëtari

Results

Season statistics

Top scorers

Notes

References 

Albania - List of final tables (RSSSF)

Kategoria Superiore seasons
1
Albanian Superliga